Walking Away is a single by New Zealand rapper K.One. It features Jason Kerrison from Opshop.

Music video
The music video for "Walking Away" was directed by Anthony Plant and shows K.One and Jason Kerrison walking. K.One going forwards and Kerrison backwards. The pair pass each other and by the end of the music video they are where the other one started.

Chart performance
Walking Away debuted on the RIANZ charts at number 38.

References

2010 singles
2010 songs
K.One songs
Illegal Musik singles
Songs written by Inoke Finau